Acestrorhynchus lacustris is a species of fish in the family Acestrorhynchidae. It was described by Christian Frederik Lütken in 1875, originally under the genus Xiphorhamphus. It inhabits the São Francisco and Paraná River.

A. lacustris spawns between July–March.

References

Acestrorhynchidae
Fish of the São Francisco River basin
Taxa named by Christian Frederik Lütken
Fish described in 1875